Simon of Backabo (Swedish: Simon i Backabo) is a 1934 Swedish comedy film directed by Gustaf Edgren and starring Fridolf Rhudin, Hilda Borgström and Sickan Carlsson. It was shot at the Råsunda Studios in Stockholm. The film's sets were designed by the art director Arne Åkermark.

Synopsis
A young man living with his grandmother and her maid Greta in the countryside, unexpectedly inherits a large fortune.

Cast
 Fridolf Rhudin as 	Simon Jönsson
 Hilda Borgström as 	Grandmother
 Sickan Carlsson as Greta
 Thor Modéen as Gustaf Strömberg
 Semmy Friedmann as Dicke Lundén
 Mona Mårtenson as 	Mary Haglund
 Holger Löwenadler as 	Charley
 Emy Hagman as 	Jenny
 Weyler Hildebrand as 	Julius Göransson
 Carl Andersson as 	Frenchman 
 Helge Andersson as 	Stationmaster in Backabo 
 Naemi Briese as 	Lisa 
 Wiola Brunius as Waitress 
 Ernst Brunman as Man in reception committee 
 Elsa Carlsson as 	Mademoiselle Claire de la Meunière 
 Sonja Claesson as 	En kvinna 
 Erland Colliander as 	Clerk at the Foreign Department 
 Julia Cæsar as 	Mrs. Ewa Amalia Roos 
 Nils Dahlgren as Man in reception committee 
 Eric Dahlström as 	Train passenger 
 Carl Deurell as 	Judge 
 John Elfström as 	Petter i Hagen 
 Albin Erlandzon as 	Man in Backabo 
 Georg Fernqvist as 	Photographer 
 Emil Fjellström as 	Porter 
 Hartwig Fock as Auctioneer 
 Knut Frankman as 	Man at the auction 
 Sigge Fürst as 	Man interested in boxing 
 Mona Geijer-Falkner as 	Woman at the auction 
 Paul Hagman as 	Man 
 Wictor Hagman as 	Photographer 
 John Hilke as 	Journalist 
 Nils Jacobsson as 	Journalist 
 Sven Jerring as 	Radio Announcer 
 Erik Johansson as 	Shopkeeper in Backabo 
 Knut Lambert as 	Man in reception committee 
 Arne Lindblad as 	Man
 Richard Lindström as 	Foreign department minister 
 Walter Lindström as 	Policeman 
 Helge Mauritz as Man in reception committee 
 Martin Nilsson as Sjungande gast på Blenda 
 Yngve Nyqvist as 	Man in reception committee 
 Knut Pehrson as 	Flight Captain 
 Algot Persson as 	Wardrober at Cafe de Paris 
 Arvid Petersén as 	Ship broker 
 Bellan Roos as 	Girl in News-Stand 
 Wanda Rothgardt as 	Assistant at the Charm Institute 
 Holger Sjöberg as 	Maitre d' at Cafe de Paris 
 Georg Skarstedt as 	Gas salesman 
 Hugo Tranberg as 	Man in reception committee 
 Ilse-Nore Tromm as 	Guest at Cafe de Paris 
 Tom Walter as Newspaper salesman 
 Ivar Widner as 	Band leader

References

Bibliography 
 Larsson, Mariah & Marklund, Anders. Swedish Film: An Introduction and Reader. Nordic Academic Press, 2010.
 Qvist, Per Olov & von Bagh, Peter. Guide to the Cinema of Sweden and Finland. Greenwood Publishing Group, 2000.

External links 
 

1934 films
1934 comedy films
Swedish comedy films
1930s Swedish-language films
Swedish black-and-white films
Films directed by Gustaf Edgren
1930s Swedish films